Bidar Fort is a fort located in old city area, Bidar, Karnataka, India. The fort, the city and the district are all affixed with the name Bidar. Sultan Ahmad Shah I of the Bahmanid dynasty shifted his capital from Gulbarga to Bidar in 1427 and built his fort along with a number of Islamic monuments. There are over 30 monuments inside Bidar fort.

The complex was put by UNESCO on its "tentative list" to become a World Heritage Site in 2014, with others in the region, under the name Monuments and Forts of the Deccan Sultanate. The Bidar Fort has stood witness to a lot of historical milestones – the rise and fall of Bahmani dynasty, rise and separation of the five Deccan Sultans, capture by the Barid Shahi and Adil Shahi dynasties, and finally being won by the Mughal emperor Aurangzeb in the blockade of Bidar in 1657.

Bidar was the capital of Bahmani Kingdom in the 14th century. Thisfort was built by Ahmad Shah Wali Bahman. The Fort was renovated in the 15th century by Sultan Ahmad Shah-I as he shifted his capital from Kalaburagi (Gulbarga) to Bidar.

Geography
Bidar city and fort are located on the edge of the Bidar plateau, the northernmost in Karnataka state. The plateau area, comprising low laterite hills, ends to the north at the Manjira River, a major tributary of the Godavari River. The Karanja River, a sub-tributary, drains the surrounding low-lying areas and feeds into the Manjiri River. Bidar district comprises the only part of the Godavari basin in Karnataka.

Geologically, Bidar district is predominantly Deccan Trap with underlying layers of gneiss emerging along the eastern boundary. Bidar fort is built in the form of an irregular rhombus on the edge of the plateau with sheer walls built along the North and the East.

History
Bidar fort was built by Ahmad Shah Wali Bahman; the exact layout of the old fort, with its double lines of defensive fortifications, is no longer discernible. Folklore suggests that the old fort was located in the western portion of the fort's present-day extent, from the Takht Mahal to the Kalmadi gate and the promontory on which Virasangayya's temple was built, with the old water tank at the base of its walls. This is confirmed in historical record in Tarikh-i Firishta, by the Persian scholar Firishta (1560-1620 CE), which states that the Government House or Darul Imara, today known as Takht Mahal, was built on the site of the old fort.

The old fort of Bidar was captured in 1321-22 AD by Prince Ulugh Khan of the Tughlaq dynasty from the Kakatiya dynasty, who later on became Sultan Muhammad bin Tughluq of Delhi.

With the establishment of the Bahmani Sultanate (1347), Bidar was occupied by Sultan Ala-ud-Din Bahman Shah. During the rule of Ahmad Shah I (1422–1486), Bidar was made the capital city of Bahmani Kingdom. Under Ahmed Shah's rule, the old Fort was rebuilt, and beautiful madrasas, mosques, palaces and gardens were raised. Firishta records that the reconstruction began in 1429 CE and ended in 1432 CE. As gunpowder had not yet been introduced into peninsular India, long and winding fort walls were constructed out of stone and mortar by Persian and Turkish architects, the stone being provided from the moat, which was excavated by Hindu masons.

Bidar fort was captured by the independent Bijapur Sultanate in 1619–20 but fell to then Mughal viceroy Aurangzeb in 1657, and was formally absorbed by the Mughal Empire in 1686. In 1724, Bidar became a part of the Asaf Jahi Kingdom of the Nizams. Nawab Mir Sa'id Muhammad Khan (also known as Salabath Jung), who was the third son of Asaf Jah I (the first Nizam of the dynasty), ruled from Bidar fort from 1751 to 1762, until his brother Mir Nizam Ali Khan, also known as Asaf Jah II, imprisoned him and later killed him in the fort on 16 September 1763. The old name for Bidar, "Mohammedabad" refers to the rule of Salabath Jung. In 1956, when the state of Hyderabad was partitioned, Bidar fort became part of the newly formed Mysore state (now Karnataka).

Architecture

The present-day Bidar fortress was rebuilt using red laterite stone around the old fort in 1428 by Ahmed Shah Bahmani. Constructed on the edge of the plateau, Bidar fort has a haphazard rhombus-shaped layout. The fort walls measure  on the outside, and include within numerous buildings, arches, pavilions, mosques, gateways and gardens. To the north and east, steep cliffs provide natural protection to the moat and the glacis; elsewhere, 
facing Bidar city, from the south-east to the south-west, the walls are protected by a unique triple-channeled moat, described by Yazdani (1995) as follows:

The seven gates of the fort are named from East to West as follows:
 Gate 1 - The Mandu Darwaza, the main gate
 Gate 2 - The Kalmadgi Darwaza,
 Gate 5 - The Delhi Darwaza,
 Gate 6 - The Kalyani Darwaza,
 Gate 7 - The Carnatic Darwaza,
 Gates 3 and 4 are without a name.

There are 37 bastions on the fort wall, with cannon made of bars of metal welded together and held together by metal hoops were mounted on the bastions. The Munda Burj is the most prominent bastion, and the heaviest guns were placed here to dominate the approaches.

Bidar fort has a number of monuments within the fortress complex. Prominent amongst them are the Rangin Mahal ("Painted Palace"), so called because of its elaborate decoration with coloured tiles; the Takht Mahal, or throne room;  the Jami Masjid ("Great Mosque") and the Sola Khamba Masjid ("Sixteen-Pillar" mosque).

With the establishment of the Bahmani Kingdom in the Deccan from 1347, the architectural styles of the Persian architecture of Iran made impressive and lasting impacts, which are seen in the Bidar Fort. The mosques, arches, gardens and the palaces were built within and also outside the fort in the Bidar city. Some of the important structures built are elaborated. Innovative systems of water management are seen in and around the fort and city of Bidar.

The influence of Persian culture was distinct in Bidar in the Deccan, during the 15th and 16th centuries.

Karez water supply system

One of the most unusual features of Bidar is the historic water supply system, called karez, (also known as qanat), which is a water harnessing technology that originated in Persia.

The technology was brought to the Deccan by the Bahmani kings of the 15th century CE, the karez system was built by Bahmani kings in the 15th century in Naubad village in Bidar, in Gulbarga and Bijapur districts in Karnataka and also in Burhanpur district in Madhya Pradesh.

The karez consists basically of a network underground canals, punctuated by vertical shafts to the surface, The karez taps into the groundwater sources (or natural springs) and transports it through the tunnel to the settlement, ending in a surface canal and/or pools in the village for various uses like drinking, washing, ablution, watering livestock, and also further used for irrigating fields, orchards and gardens.

The rocky soil in Bidar makes access to drinking water very difficult and the karez was built in order to provide drinking water to civilian settlements and the garrison inside the Bidar fort. A few karez shafts have been closed by builders and developers, leaving only 17 visible today.

Gallery

Access
Bidar is well connected by road, rail and air links.

Though the nearest airfield is in Bidar itself, it is an air force station and flight access . The nearest commercial airports are Bidar Airport and Rajiv Gandhi International Airport, in Hyderabad.

In popular culture
Parts of Kannada cinema Bara were shot at Bidar Fort, while most of the movie was shot at Bidar and surrounding places. The song "Ishq Sufiyaana" from the hit Bollywood film of 2011, The Dirty Picture was shot in the Bidar Fort. The song had sequences in the fort with Vidya Balan and Emraan Hashmi.

See also
 Bahmanid dynasty
 Forts of Karnataka
 Raichur Fort
 Gulbarga Fort
 Bellary Fort
 Basavakalyana Fort
 Mudgal Fort
Golconda Fort

References

External links

 Bidar fort stands the test of time.
 A platform to gaze upon moonlit skies.
 Escape route near royal harem found at Bidar Fort.
 For More About Bidar Fort (Tourism Official Website).

Forts in Karnataka
Buildings and structures in Bidar district
Former capital cities in India
Tourist attractions in Bidar
Bahmani architecture